Lochloosa is an unincorporated community in Alachua County, Florida, United States. Lochloosa has a post office with ZIP code 32662, which opened on September 9, 1881.

References

Unincorporated communities in Alachua County, Florida
Unincorporated communities in Florida